The William Jennings Bryan Boyhood Home is a historic house located at 408 S. Broadway in Salem, Illinois. The house was the birthplace and boyhood home of William Jennings Bryan, three-time Democratic Party nominee for president. The two-story frame house was built in 1852 for Silas Bryan, an Illinois State Senator and father of William Jennings Bryan. William Jennings Bryan was born in the home in 1860.

The city of Salem operates the home as a museum, including information and memorabilia about Bryan, his politics and his times. Bryan himself donated the house to the city in the early 1900s, as he wished for it to become a museum. The house features two main rooms in the front, a kitchen and a dining room in back, and three bedrooms upstairs.

The house was listed on the National Register of Historic Places in 1975.

Notes

External links
City of Salem: Bryan Home Museum
Information about the museum and nearby sites

Houses in Marion County, Illinois
Historic house museums in Illinois
Museums in Marion County, Illinois
National Register of Historic Places in Marion County, Illinois
Biographical museums in Illinois
William Jennings Bryan
Houses on the National Register of Historic Places in Illinois
William Jennings Bryan family